Paul Archibald Brent (March 4, 1907, Baltimore – March 11, 1997, Baltimore) was an American musician, the first African American to attend the prestigious Peabody Conservatory in Baltimore, Maryland. He graduated in 1953.

References

Musicians from Baltimore
1907 births
1997 deaths
20th-century American musicians
Musicians from Maryland
20th-century African-American musicians